Eric Hewitt, also by his tag GH057ayame (Ghostayame), is a retired professional Major League Gaming (MLG) gamer. He now works for 343 Industries working on future Halo games.

Career
Raised in Westfield, New Jersey, Hewitt attended Pennsylvania State University and became a member of Carbon in August 2006 under the gamertag GH057ayame.  Carbon's efforts were finally rewarded with the national Halo 2 4v4 Championship in 2006, followed by a 2nd-place finish in the 2007 Championship, beaten by former rivals Final Boss. Carbon struggled with the switch from Halo 2 to Halo 3 in 2008 and lost their dominance on the Pro Circuit. With three 7th-place finishes and only one top 4 finish throughout the season, Carbon ended the season with a surprising 3rd-place finish at the National Championships. After placing 8th in the first two tournaments in 2009, Carbon decided to drop Ghostayame, who took Walshy's place in Team Instinct for Dallas. But a bad performance (Ghostayame went -53 that tournament (all matches combined)) destroyed a further cooperation with Instinct, who decided to release Ghostayame after a 3rd place in Dallas. Only having played one tournament for Instinct, Ghostayame then joined Team Classic for Anaheim and ended up with a 6th place. He said that "Anaheim will be Judgement Day" for Instinct, which his team then beat 3–2 in Winner's Bracket Round 2, which felt like a "sweet revenge" for Ghostayame. In the end Classic even finished one place higher than Instinct, who only became 7th that tournament. In 2011, Hewitt branched out into Gears of War, hoping to compete in MLG play if the game is accepted into the tournament.

On January 14, 2014, 343 Industries announced that they had hired Hewitt.

MLG

2007

2006

Pro's Choice Awards
3rd Best Support Player

2005

References

External links
Scion Player of MLG New York 2006 - GH057ayame WMV file
"The Star-Ledger" Newspaper - REACHING FOR 6 FIGURES

Living people
American esports players
Halo (franchise) players
Pennsylvania State University alumni
People from Westfield, New Jersey
Year of birth missing (living people)